Potassium/sodium hyperpolarization-activated cyclic nucleotide-gated ion channel 2 is a protein that in humans is encoded by the HCN2 gene.

Interactions 

HCN2 has been shown to interact with HCN1 and HCN4.

Function 

The function of the channel is not known although its activation by hyperpolarization alludes to the funny channels in the sinoatrial node of the heart (which form the basis of spontaneous generation of electrical rhythm). These channels have recently been associated with chronic pain and blocking the gene is associated with resolution of neuropathic episodes of pain.

See also 
 Cyclic nucleotide-gated ion channel

References

Further reading

External links 
 

Ion channels